The province of Central Kalimantan in Indonesia is divided into regencies which in turn are divided administratively into districts, known as Kecamantan.

The districts of Central Kalimantan, with the regency each falls into, are as follows:

Antang Kalang, Kotawaringin Timur
Arut Selatan, Kotawaringin Barat
Arut Utara, Kotawaringin Barat
Awang, Barito Timur
Baamang, Kotawaringin Timur
Balai Riam, Sukamara
Banamatingang, Pulang Pisau
Barito Tuhup Raya, Murung Raya
Basarang, Kapuas
Benua Lima, Barito Timur
Bukit Batu, Palangka Raya
Bulik, Lamandau
Cempaga, Kotawaringin Timur
Danau Sembuluh, Seruyan
Delang, Lamandau
Dusun Hilir, Barito Selatan
Dusun Selatan, Barito Selatan
Dusun Tengah, Barito Timur
Dusun Timur, Barito Timur
Dusun Utara, Barito Selatan
Gunung Bintang Awai, Barito Selatan
Gunung Purei, Barito Utara
Gunung Timang, Barito Utara
Hanau, Seruyan
Jekan Raya, Palangka Raya
Jelai, Sukamara
Jenamas, Barito Selatan
Kahayan Hilir, Pulang Pisau
Kahayan Hulu Utara, Gunung Mas
Kahayan Kuala, Pulang Pisau
Kahayan Tengah, Pulang Pisau
Kamipang, Katingan
Kapuas Barat, Kapuas
Kapuas Hilir, Kapuas
Kapuas Hulu, Kapuas
Kapuas Kuala, Kapuas
Kapuas Murung, Kapuas
Kapuas Timur, Kapuas
Karau Kuala, Barito Selatan
Karusen Janang, Barito Timur
Katingan Hilir, Katingan
Katingan Hulu, Katingan
Katingan Kuala, Katingan
Katingan Tengah, Katingan
Kota Besi, Kotawaringin Timur
Kotawaringin Lama, Kotawaringin Barat
Kumai, Kotawaringin Barat
Kurun, Gunung Mas
Lahei, Barito Utara
Lamandau, Lamandau
Laung Tuhup, Murung Raya
Maliku, Pulang Pisau
Mantangai, Kapuas
Marikit, Katingan
Mendawai, Katingan
Mentawa Baru, Kotawaringin Timur
Mentaya Hilir Selatan, Kotawaringin Timur
Mentaya Hilir Utara, Kotawaringin Timur
Mentaya Hulu, Kotawaringin Timur
Montalat, Barito Utara
Munuhing, Gunung Mas
Murung, Murung Raya
Pahandut, Palangka Raya
Paku, Barito Timur
Pandih Batu, Pulang Pisau
Pangkalan Banteng, Kotawaringin Barat
Pangkalan Lada, Kotawaringin Barat
Parenggean, Kotawaringin Timur
Patangkep Tutui, Barito Timur
Pematang Karau, Barito Timur
Permata Intan, Murung Raya
Pulau Hanaut, Kotawaringin Timur
Pulau Malan, Katingan
Pulau Petak, Kapuas
Rakumpit, Palangka Raya
Raren Batuah, Barito Timur
Rungan, Gunung Mas
Sanaman Mantikei, Katingan
Sebangau Kuala, Pulang Pisau
Sebangau, Palangka Raya
Selat, Kapuas
Sepang, Gunung Mas
Seribu Riam, Murung Raya
Seruyan Hilir, Seruyan
Seruyan Hulu, Seruyan
Seruyan Tengah, Seruyan
Sukamara, Sukamara
Sumber Barito, Murung Raya
Sungai Babuat, Murung Raya
Tanah Siang, Murung Raya
Tasik Payawan, Katingan
Tewah, Gunung Mas
Tewang Sangalang Garing, Katingan
Teweh Tengah, Barito Utara
Teweh Timur, Barito Utara
Timpah, Kapuas
U’Ut Murung, Murung Raya

 
Central Kalimantan